The 2021 Open Bogotá was a professional tennis tournament played on clay courts. It was the thirteenth edition of the tournament which was part of the 2021 ATP Challenger Tour. It took place in Bogotá, Colombia between 18 and 24 October 2021.

Singles main-draw entrants

Seeds

 1 Rankings are as of 4 October 2021.

Other entrants
The following players received wildcards into the singles main draw:
  Alejandro Gómez
  Juan Sebastián Gómez
  Enrique Peña

The following player received entry into the singles main draw using a protected ranking:
  Gerald Melzer

The following player received entry into the singles main draw as an alternate:
  Matías Zukas

The following players received entry from the qualifying draw:
  Nicolás Barrientos
  Luca Castelnuovo
  Enzo Couacaud
  Jaroslav Pospíšil

Champions

Singles

  Gerald Melzer def.  Facundo Mena 6–2, 3–6, 7–6(7–5).

Doubles

  Nicolás Jarry /  Roberto Quiroz def.  Nicolás Barrientos /  Alejandro Gómez 6–7(4–7), 7–5, [10–4].

References

2021 ATP Challenger Tour
2021
2021 in Colombian tennis
October 2021 sports events in South America